Bontempi is a surname. Notable people with the surname include:
Checco Bontempi, Italian musician and producer, member of the group Corona and records under the alias Lee Marrow
Giovanni Andrea Bontempi (c. 1624 – 1705), Italian singer, composer and music theorist
Guido Bontempi (born 1960), Italian cyclist
Paola Bontempi (born 1971), Spanish actress
Gianluca Bontempi (born 1968), Italian professor in Machine Learning Group, Université Libre de Bruxelles, director of Interuniversity Institute of Bioinformatics in Brussels from 2013 to 2017
Pier Carlo Bontempi (born 1954), Italian traditionalist architect
Teresina Bontempi (1883–1968), Swiss writer, editor and journalist